Osinovka may refer to:
 Osinovka, boat is a boat extended among coast-dwellers. 
Osinovka, until 1938, name of the town of Osinniki in Kemerovo Oblast, Russia
Osinovka, a former urban-type settlement in Irkutsk Oblast, Russia; since 1999—part of the city of Bratsk
Osinovka, Primorsky Krai, a village (selo) in Primorsky Krai, Russia
Osinovka, Republic of Tatarstan, a village in the Republic of Tatarstan, Russia
Osinovka, name of several other rural localities in Russia